T.W.O （ティー・ダブリュ・オー "tee doubleyou oh"）is Aya Matsuura's second album, released on January 29, 2003. The Title is somewhat of a pun: It is her Second Album (so now she's released Two albums) and serves as an acronym for "That Wonderful One", of course, referring to Aya herself. It contains four of her previously released singles as well as a solo version of SHALL WE LOVE? that she had originally sung as part of Gomattou.

Track listing
 
 
 
 
 
 SHINE MORE
 SHALL WE LOVE? (Matsuura Version)

References

2003 albums
Aya Matsuura albums